Nuxsha Nasih Ahmed (also spelled Nukhsha in English;  ; referred to Nuxshe Nasih or Nuxshe Naseh, born 1978 or 1977) is the Mayor of Halabja in Iraqi Kurdistan. She is the second woman to be appointed to the most prominent political office in Halabja.

Nasih was elected Mayor of Halabja in 2016. The Kurdish news service Rudaw noted that she was the second woman to hold the top office in Halabja, the first being Lady Adela (Adela Khanum). "the effective mayor of the town from 1909 until her death in 1924." Nasih commented on her appointment that, "Appointing women to senior positions is nothing new in Halabja. The educated people of the city have always supported this idea."

Nasih is a member of the Patriotic Union of Kurdistan (PUK), which won the 2014 elections in the town. Prior to her appointment as Mayor, she was the commissioner for the Biyare sub-district on the border with Iran for seven years, and trained as a lawyer. She was supported by Hero Ibrahim Ahmad, the former First Lady of Iraq and wife of PUK leader Jalal Talabani.

Nasih has worked with officials in the neighbouring Iranian Kurdish province of Kermanshah to officially recognise two border crossings connecting the regions. Iran is aiming to export electricity to the Kurdistan region through Halabja. She is also working to end the use of plastic bags in Halabja with the 'Green City Halabja' campaign.

In 2019 she spoke at George Washington University in Washington DC on the legacy of the genocidal Al-Anfal Campaign in which Saddam Hussein killed thousands of civilians in Halabja using poison gas in 1988.

References 

21st-century Kurdish women politicians
Kurdish politicians
Mayors of places in Iraq
Living people
Year of birth missing (living people)